Brand New Age is the second studio album released by English punk band the U.K. Subs. It was released in 1980 on RCA/GEM Records. It is the U.K. Subs' most successful studio recording, reaching number 18 in the UK album charts and staying in the chart for nine weeks.

The album saw the band expand both musically and lyrically, taking on subjects such as government intrusion, violence and religious fundamentalism, terrorism, as well as established Subs themes of alcohol, drugs, motorbikes, girls and youth subcultures.

Brand New Age included two hit singles; "Warhead", warning of the danger of the Cold War and the growing threat of Islamic Jihadism in Afghanistan, and which reached number 30 in the UK singles charts in March 1980; and "Teenage", which reached 32 in the UK charts in May 1980.

Critical reception
The album was awarded five stars by Sounds magazine writer Garry Bushell, and four stars in Record Mirror, though as Alex Ogg wrote later, "the band might as well have not existed for all the attention trendier publications like the "NME" would afford them". The mixed reception did not trouble band leader  Charlie Harper. Speaking to Rising Free Fanzine, Harper said he was pleased with the album's critical reception; "I really like the second album, more than the first one. I thought it was a good one. So I was more than happy with the reviews".

More recently, AllMusic reviewer Victor W. Valdivia praised Brand New Age for its ambition and lyrical depth; "The UK Subs came of age on this album, and proved they were one of the best, most promising acts of their era," he wrote.

Track list
All songs written by Charlie Harper and Nicky Garratt, except where noted.

Personnel
UK Subs
Charlie Harper – vocals.
Nicky Garratt – guitar.
Paul Slack – bass guitar.
Pete Davies – drums.

Additional personnel
Laurie Dipple – engineer
Tim Smith – design
Paul Slattery – photography

References

External links
UK Subs official archive

1980 albums
U.K. Subs albums
RCA Records albums